A hansoku or hansoku-make is a disqualifying penalty in a number of martial arts.

See also
 Kinjite (disqualifying fouls) in Sumo
 Penalties in Judo 
 Hansoku-mate is one of the penalties in various styles of Karate

References

Martial arts